The Towle WC, aka Towle TA-1, was a custom built aircraft for a 1929 round-the world flight.

Design and development
Thomas Towle was an engineer who had been involved with many early aircraft designs. Having just co-designed the Eastman-E2 Sea Rover, Towle was commissioned by Henry McCarroll to promote Detroit's aviation production capabilities.

The WC was a flying boat with an aluminum hull. The strut braced parasol wing was fabric covered.

Operational history
The prototype WC flew as far as Brazil before engine reliability issues forced the cancellation of the round-the-world flight attempt.

Variants
 Towle TA-2 Was built as a successor to the WC model

Specifications (Towle WC)

References

Amphibious aircraft